Parkanji (also Romanized as Parkanjī; also known as Parganjī) is a village in Rak Rural District, in the Central District of Kohgiluyeh County, Kohgiluyeh and Boyer-Ahmad Province, Iran. At the 2006 census, its population was 26, in 6 families.

References 

Populated places in Kohgiluyeh County